I. Daniel Stewart (1933 – June 23, 2005) was a judge of the Utah Supreme Court from 1979 to 2000.

Stewart served a mission for the Church of Jesus Christ of Latter-day Saints in Germany.  While there, in about 1956, he contracted polio which left him confined to a wheel chair for the rest of his life.

Stewart earned a law degree from the University of Utah.  He worked for the US government fighting trusts for a time and then became a law professor at the University of Utah.

Stewart was the lone dissenter from the 1993 Utah Supreme Court ruling that allowed prayers before government meetings as long as there was no religious restriction on who could give the prayer.

In addition, in the case Bagford v. Ephraim City, 904 P.2d 1095, he wrote the Court's opinion which concluded that creating a city-owned waste disposal company financed via municipal taxes was not a taking of private property even though it put the pre-existing waste-disposal company out of business.

Sources
Deseret News, May 10, 2000
Deseret News, 25 June 2005, obituary for Stewart

1933 births
Latter Day Saints from Utah
American Mormon missionaries in Germany
Utah state court judges
Justices of the Utah Supreme Court
University of Utah alumni
University of Utah faculty
2005 deaths
20th-century Mormon missionaries
People with polio
20th-century American judges